Statistics of Belgian First Division in the 1934–35 season.

Overview

It was contested by 14 teams, and Royale Union Saint-Gilloise won the championship.

League standings

Results

References

Belgian Pro League seasons
Belgian First Division, 1934-35
1934–35 in Belgian football